Mooresville is an unincorporated community in Marshall County, in the U.S. state of Tennessee.

History
A post office called Mooresville was established in 1836, and remained in operation until 1902. The community has the name of Ashley Moore, a pioneer settler.

References

Unincorporated communities in Marshall County, Tennessee
Unincorporated communities in Tennessee